AKB48 Team SH (also known as 冲吧少女组合/Chong Ba Shaonu Zuhe)  is a Chinese idol group based in Shanghai, China and an official sister group of the Japanese idol girl group AKB48.  It was established in 2018 after the dissolution of AKB48's relationship with the girl group SNH48 back in 2016.

History 
On April 10, 2018, the application process was opened for the formation of Team SH, in which 38,066 girls registered by May. The applications were reviewed, and the second round consisted of interviews that were held in six cities. A third round was conducted in Shanghai, of which 62 girls were finalists and performed in singing and dancing. On July 25, it was announced that 34 members have been selected for the first generation of Team SH.  Two of the members, Liu Nian and Mao WeiJia had previously participated in the idol competition show Produce 101.

Members 
On August 8, 2018 AKB48 Team SH posted the list of members on Weibo.
Bolded names indicate captain.

Official members

Trainees

Former members

Discography

single

See also 
 AKB48 Team TP
 MNL48
 SGO48
 BNK48
 JKT48
 AKB48

References

External links 
 
 
 
 AKB48TeamSH on Bilibili
 
 
 

AKB48 Group
Musical groups from Shanghai
Chinese pop music groups
Chinese girl groups
Chinese idols
Musical groups established in 2018
2018 establishments in China